Tel Arad, in Arabic Tell 'Arad (تل عراد), is an archaeological tell, or mound, located west of the Dead Sea, about  west of the modern Israeli city of Arad in an area surrounded by mountain ridges which is known as the Arad Plain. The site is divided into a lower city and an upper section on a hill.

The lower Canaanite settlement and the upper Israelite citadel are now part of the Tel Arad National Park, which has begun projects to restore the walls of the upper and lower sites.

Proposed identification
It was first identified in modern literature in 1841 by Edward Robinson in his Biblical Researches in Palestine, on account of the similarity of the Arabic place name, Tell 'Arad, with the Harad in the Book of Joshua.

Archaeology

The upper and lower areas of Tel Arad were excavated during 18 seasons by Ruth Amiran and Yohanan Aharoni between 1962 and 1984. An additional 8 seasons were done on the Iron Age water system.

History

Chalcolithic
The lower area was first settled during the Chalcolithic period, around 4000 BCE.

Early Bronze Age: Canaanite settlements

In the Early Bronze, Tel Arad was occupied in the Early Bronze I-II and took part in the Beersheba Valley copper trade.

The Early Bronze I saw Tel Arad Stratum III.

The Early Bronze II saw rich remains at Tel Arad Stratum II.

It was abandoned in the EB III with the rise of central trading sites in the Negev Highlands related to the copper industry in the Arabah and trade towards Egypt in the Old Kingdom.

Iron Age: Israelite settlement

The site was only resettled by Israelites from the 11th century BCE onwards, initially as an unwalled area defined as an official or sacred domain was established on the upper hill, and then later as a garrison-town or citadel.

Israelite fort ostraca
In the 3rd season of excavation, over 100 ostraca (inscribed pottery shards) written in Hebrew, dated to the 7th century BC were found in stratum VI of the fort at Arad. Most of these consist of everyday military correspondence between the commanders of the fort and are addressed to Eliashib, thought to be the fort's quartermaster. One ostracon mentions "house of YHWH" which some scholars believe is a reference to the Jerusalem temple. With them was found a partial, hieratic ostracon, similarly dated. The supplies listed included south-Egyptian barley and animal fats (vs the wheat and olive oil in the Hebrew ostraca). Later an ostracon was found with text in both hieratic and Hebrew-Phoenician signary, both not a bilingual text.

Israelite temple

The temple at Arad was uncovered by archaeologist Yohanan Aharoni in 1962 who spent the rest of his life investigating it, dying there in the mid-1970s.

In the holy of holies of this temple two incense altars and two possible stele or standing stones were found. Unidentified dark material preserved on their upper surfaces was submitted for organic residue analysis and traces of cannabinoids, cannabis, boswellic acid, and norursatriene (which derives from frankincense) were detected. While the use of frankincense for cultic purposes is well-known, this finding is of especial importance insofar as it represents the "first known evidence of hallucinogenic substance found in the Kingdom of Judah."

Hellenistic and Roman periods
It is believed that several citadels were built one upon the other and existed in the Hellenistic and Roman periods.

Herod even reconstructed the lower city for the purpose of making bread. The site lasted until the end of the Bar Kokhba revolt 135 CE.

Muslim conquest to Abbasid period
Tel Arad lay in ruins for 500 years until the Early Islamic period, when the former Roman citadel was rebuilt and remodeled by some prosperous clan in the area and functioned for 200 years until around 861, when there was a breakdown of central authority and a period of widespread rebellion and unrest. The citadel was destroyed and no more structures were built on the site.

See also
 Archaeology of Israel
 Cities of the ancient Near East
 Tourism in Israel

References

Sources

External links
Tel Arad National Park 
Pictures of Tel arad
Brief pictorial compendium of the Arad Judean Temple

National parks of Israel
Hebrew Bible cities
Torah cities
Ancient sites in Israel
Prehistoric sites in Israel
Former populated places in Southwest Asia
Bronze Age sites in Israel
Iron Age sites in Israel
Former populated places in Israel
Protected areas of Southern District (Israel)
Buildings and structures in Southern District (Israel)
Tells (archaeology)
Ancient Jewish settlements of Judaea
1962 archaeological discoveries
1962 in Israel